The Sanki Yedim Mosque is a historic mosque built by Keçeci Hayreddin (Khair Al-Deen) Efendi in the district of Fatih in Istanbul in 1750

Name origin
Sanki Yedim Mosque was built by Keçeci Hayreddin (Khair Al-Deen) Efendi who lived in the district of Fatih in Istanbul. Whenever Keçeci Hayreddin (Khair Al-Deen) walked in the market and desired something to eat, he would say: “Sanki Yedim” or “As if I have eaten” and saved the cost of the meal, fruit or sweet in a box. He kept on doing the same thing every time he desired anything say; “Sanki Yedim”.
After several years, he discovered that he had collected a good amount of money which is enough to build a small Mosque. And because the people knew his story they started to call the Mosque Sanki Yedim Camii “As If I Have Eaten Mosque”.

History
The original Mosque burned during the First World War and it was rebuilt in 1960.

References

Ottoman mosques in Istanbul
Landmarks in Turkey
Fatih
18th-century mosques
Historic sites in Turkey
Constantinople